Östermalm is a borough (stadsdelsområde) in central Stockholm,Sweden. It is named after the dominating district. Except Östermalm (proper) there are four districts in the borough: Djurgården, Hjorthagen, Ladugårdsgärdet (popularly known as Gärdet), and Norra Djurgården. Note that a portion of northern Östermalm is organized in Norrmalm borough. The population  is 70,779 on an area of 18.00 km², which gives a density of 3,932.17/km².

See also
Norra Djurgårdsstaden

References

External links

Boroughs of Stockholm

hu:Östermalm (kerület)